The Siddeley Puma was a British aero engine developed towards the end of World War I and produced by Siddeley-Deasy. The first engines left the production lines of Siddeley-Deasy in Coventry in August 1917, production continued until December 1918. At least 4,288 of the 11,500 ordered engines were delivered, orders were cancelled following the Armistice. Production was continued under the name Armstrong Siddeley Puma when the manufacturer was bought by Armstrong Whitworth and became Armstrong Siddeley.

The engine was based on a previous B.H.P engine which was also developed as the Galloway "Adriatic."

Applications
The Puma engine was used in the British World War I bomber aircraft, the Airco D.H.9. In use it proved to be highly troublesome, making the aircraft significantly inferior to the type it replaced. The engine was also installed untidily, with the cylinder heads protruding. The D.H.9, as a type, was improved by replacing the Puma engine with the Liberty 12 to make the D.H.9A.
The unit was used in the first prototype of the Airco DH.10 Amiens in a twin-engined pusher configuration but as performance was unsatisfactory, alternative engines were used in a subsequent prototype of the type and production models.
Short Silver Streak (1920)

Specifications (Puma)

See also

References

Notes

Bibliography

 Lumsden, Alec. British Piston Engines and their Aircraft. Marlborough, Wiltshire: Airlife Publishing, 2003. .

External links

 Contemporary technical description of the engine with photographs.
The Virtual Aviation Museum

Puma
1910s aircraft piston engines